Cabo San Lucas ("Saint Luke Cape"), or simply just Cabo, is a resort city at the southern tip of the Baja California Peninsula, in the Mexican state of Baja California Sur. As at the 2020 Census, the population of the city was 202,694 inhabitants. Cabo San Lucas together with the famous San José del Cabo are collectively known as Los Cabos. Together, they form a metropolitan area of 351,111 inhabitants.

Rated as one of Mexico's top five tourist destinations, Cabo is known for its beaches, scuba diving locations, Balnearios, the sea arch El Arco de Cabo San Lucas, and marine life. The Los Cabos Corridor has become a heavily trafficked vacation destination for tourists, with numerous resorts and timeshares along the coast between Cabo San Lucas and San José del Cabo.

The waters around Cabo are home to marine wildlife including rays, sharks, mahi-mahi (dorado), and striped marlin.

History

Archaeological excavations have shown evidence of continual human habitation in the area for at least 10,000 years. When the first Europeans arrived, they encountered the Pericú people, who survived on a subsistence diet based on hunting and gathering seeds, roots, shellfish, and other marine resources. They called the location Yenecamú.

According to the narrative of Hatsutaro, a Japanese castaway, in the book Kaigai Ibun (written by Maekawa, Junzo, and Bunzo Sakai and narrated by Hatsutaro), when he arrived at Cabo San Lucas in May 1842, there were only two houses and about 20 inhabitants. However, American authors such as Henry Edwards and John Ross Browne claim that Cabo San Lucas's founder was an Englishman named Thomas "Old Tom" Ritchie. John Ross Browne says Ritchie arrived there about 1828, while Edwards says that he died in October 1874.
The actual founder of Cabo San Lucas was Cipriano Ceseña in 1788 who arrived from Hermosillo, Sonora. Per The book by Pablo L. Martinez, Guia Familiar de Baja California 1700–1900.

A fishing village began growing in the area. In 1917, an American company built a floating platform to catch tuna, and ten years later founded Compañía de Productos Marinos S.A. The plant operated for several years.

Tourism

Cabo San Lucas has become a prominent vacation and spa destination, with a variety of sites of interest and timeshares that have been built on the coast between San Lucas and San José del Cabo. The distinctive Arco de Cabo San Lucas is a local landmark.

Cabo San Lucas has the highest-paying marlin tournament in the world, the Bisbee's Los Cabos Offshore. This tournament takes place every year in the month of October.

In the winter, pods of whales can be observed in the area.

Development

The beaches, surfing, and sport fishing opportunities in Cabo San Lucas have attracted a great number of Mexican natives and foreigners to spend their vacations in large-scale tourist developments. The development of Cabo's tourism industry was prompted by the Mexican government's development of infrastructure to turn Cabo San Lucas into a major centre for tourism in Mexico, beginning in 1974. Upon completion of the Transpeninsular Highway, also known as the Mexican Federal Highway 1, tourist developments in Los Cabos proceeded relatively unchecked.

Until fairly recently, the unique and fragile environment of this part of Mexico was largely unprotected by law, and therefore was subjected to developers acting in concert with government agencies interested only in low-end tourist bonanzas. There is, however, a growing collection of activists and attorneys now involved in preserving many of Baja's desert habitats, marine mammals, and stretches of coastline. A number of agencies, including the Gulf of California Conservation Fund and the Centre for Environmental Law in La Paz, are challenging the destruction of wetlands and other ecosystems from Los Cabos to Ensenada. In the face of a growing international public demand for corporate-driven ecological stewardship, higher-end resorts in the Los Cabos area are increasingly sensitive to their environmental impact and are taking initial steps to institute sustainable practices such as reducing water usage and non-recyclable trash output. In 2017, Los Cabos was projected to be one of the leaders in travel in Latin America, many of the developments owed to its increased accessibility with added plane routes from the US and Canada. It is expected that by 2018, 4,000 new sleeping rooms will come online in Cabo, and the increase in tourism will contribute to its growth as a leader in leisure.

Transportation 

Cabo San Lucas and San José del Cabo are served by Los Cabos International Airport.

The town is also a popular port of call for many cruise ships. Cabo San Lucas has a small international airfield, which handles air traffic for general aviation flights and air taxi services.

Many tourists get around the area through the numerous local taxis that service the primary parts of Cabo, as well as the corridor and the airport. Another alternative is the bus system which is less expensive than taxis. It costs several pesos and it is mainly used by locals but also available to tourists. As of 2021, Uber is available as a means of transportation in the Los Cabos area.

Nightlife and activities

Clubs in Cabo include the Cabo Wabo Cantina, a nightclub owned by rock star Sammy Hagar, founded originally by himself and other members of Van Halen, named after their hit single Cabo Wabo. There is also the Baja Brewing Company (also the first microbrewery in Baja California), La Vaquita, Mandala, Coco Bongo, El Squid Roe, Giggling Marlin, Nowhere Bar, and Tiki Bar, the Usual Suspects and the Jungle Bar. Restaurants in downtown Cabo include Edith's, Hacienda Cocina y Cantina, and Sunset da Mona Lisa. Tourists can also ride horses through the desert, and charter a boat for fishing, snorkeling, scuba, free diving, whale-watching, and parasail on the beach. The English-language newspaper for Cabo San Lucas, the biweekly Gringo Gazette, has news on tourist activities in Cabo San Lucas, San Jose, Todos Santos, La Paz, and the East Cape Baja.

Resort corridor

The corridor is home to a variety of hotels and tourist attractions.

High-end luxury resorts in the corridor are Las Ventanas al Paraiso (Rosewood Resort), Waldorf Astoria Pedregal, Chileno Bay Resort (Auberge Resort), Esperanza (Auberge Resort), One&Only Palmilla, and the Montage Los Cabos.

Other hotels in the corridor include the Cape (Thompson Hotel), Villas del Palmar (Villagroup Resorts & Spa), Marquis Los Cabos, Casa Dorada, Cabo del Sol, Breathless (AMResorts), Riu Baja California, Riu Santa Fe & Riu Palace, SUR, Grand Velas, Grand Solmar, Le Blanc, Garza Blanca & Villa La Valencia, Hilton Los Cabos, Pueblo Bonito Resorts, Solaz, and Sheraton, among many others.

Chileno Bay is one of the most frequented beaches in the Corridor. It is home to tropical fish, sea turtles, invertebrates, and sponges. Snorkelers often visit this beach to observe underwater sea life.

Climate
The extreme south of Baja California has a tropical desert climate (Köppen: BWh). Even with the thermal amplitude, there are no freezes.

During summer, Cabo San Lucas is cooler than San José del Cabo by about 1.5 to 3 °C (3 to 5 °F).  Sometimes during the summer, when winds blow from the Pacific Ocean instead of the Gulf of California, the differences in temperatures between San José del Cabo and Cabo San Lucas are higher.

Cabo San Lucas is less rainy than San José del Cabo, although hurricanes can bring heavy rain for long periods. Hurricane Odile made landfall at Cabo San Lucas on 14 September 2014, and caused widespread damage. Due to the position of the city and orography, local summer thunderstorms do not get near enough to bring rain to the town.

Population

As of 2015, the population was 81,111 and has experienced very rapid growth and development. It is the third-largest city in Baja California Sur after La Paz and San José del Cabo.

The majority of non-Mexican inhabitants in the community originate from the United States, and along with residents from San José del Cabo they account for 80% of the U.S. population in the state.

Education

Secondary
 Moises Saenz Garza Downtown Los Cabos, public school
 Colegio Papalotl known as Liceo. Complex of multiple education levels
 Colegio Amaranto, a private school in Cabo San Lucas
 Colegio El Camino, IB accredited K–12 private school, in Pedregal, Cabo San Lucas

High School
 CETMAR N°31 Public High School, Multiple ocean education branches.
 Cobach N°04 Public High School, Technic education.

University
 Instituto de Estudios Superiores de Los Cabos, a campus of the National Technological Institute of Mexico
 UABCS Los Cabos, a branch campus of the public Universidad Autónoma de Baja California Sur

See also
 El tezal, new residential zone
 Mexican Federal Highway 1
 Mexican Federal Highway 19
 Sebastián Vizcaíno

References

Tropical Storm Lidia (August 2017) creates mudslide in Cabo San Lucas - Pure Cabo

External links

 
 

 
San Lucas
Landforms of Baja California Sur
Los Cabos Municipality (Baja California Sur)
Populated places in Baja California Sur
Populated coastal places in Mexico
Port cities and towns on the Mexican Pacific coast
Beaches of Baja California Sur